Mohammad Rafiq (born 1943) is a Bangladeshi poet. He was awarded Bangla Academy Literary Award in 1987 and Ekushey Padak in 2010.

Early life 

Rafiq was born in 1943 in the village of Baitpur, Bagerhat, Bangladesh (then India). In his youth, his country was going through a political instability. During his student life at Dhaka University he was a political activist and was arrested and jailed twice. Pakistani martial law court sentenced him ten years of hard labour. He later was released earlier to complete his university studies. During the War of Independence of Bangladesh, he served as a Sector-1 commander and motivated the freedom fighters. Later he worked with the Swadhin Bangla Betar Kendra.

Bangladesh and autocratic regime 

"Through Mohammad Rafiq's dozen volumes of poetry, Bengali readers have witnessed not only the evolution of a distinctive personal vision and style but also a reflection of the changing fortunes of a homeland—all against a backdrop of folk tradition (a typically Bengali mix of Hindu and Muslim lore) and timeless images of water and sky, sun and rain, clouds and dust. This is not to say that Rafiq's poems tend to be predominantly "political" (other poets of Bangladesh more regularly respond to specific events and issues). Rather, an awareness Bangladesh's freedom struggle, the time of idealism and hope after independence, and the long dark period of military rule after the assassination of the new nation's first democratically elected leader, Sheikh Mujib Rahman, should help readers from less turbulent parts of the world understand the potentially explosive impact of a particular literary work and the extraordinary risks that a writer may take in writing and publishing it. When Hossain Muhammad Ershad—a dictator who fancied himself a poet—seized power in 1982, the people of Bangladesh had to endure crushing repression from his regime and from the growing forces of communalism."

During the dictatorship of Hossain Muhammad Ershad, Rafiq wrote Khola Kabita (Open Poem) and it was published as a leaflet and was circulated throughout the country. It was the first voice raised against the unlawful military autocracy. It became very popular among the student activists and they performed the poem as drama and song. Later on, he was summoned and interrogated before a military board of inquiry. A warrant for arresting him was also issued. By this time, Mohammad Rafiq escaped and began to live in hiding.

Career 

Rafiq worked as a teacher at Chittagong College and at Dhaka College. After working in the Department of English, Jahangirnagar University for three decades, he retired in 2009.

Awards 
1981: Alaol Literary Award
1987: Bangla Academy Literary Award
2010: Ekushey Padak

Works 
1970: Boishakhi Purnima 
1976: Dhulor Shonshare Ei Mati 
1979: Kirtinasha 
1983: Khola Kobita 
1983: Kapila
1986: Gaodiya
1988: Shodeshi Nishshash Tumi Moy
1991: Meghay Ebong Kadai

References

Further reading

External links 
 Mohammad Rafiq - Biographical Sketch
 International Writing Program: The University of IOWA

1943 births
Living people
Bangladeshi male poets
University of Dhaka alumni
Academic staff of Dhaka College
Academic staff of Jahangirnagar University
Recipients of Bangla Academy Award
Recipients of the Ekushey Padak
Recipients of Mazharul Islam Poetry Award
People from Bagerhat District